The men's 1500 metres at the 1938 European Athletics Championships was held in Paris, France, at Stade Olympique de Colombes on 3 and 5 September 1938.

Medalists

Results

Final
5 September

Heats
3 September

Heat 1

Heat 2

Participation
According to an unofficial count, 14 athletes from 9 countries participated in the event.

 (1)
 (2)
 (2)
 (2)
 (1)
 (1)
 (1)
 (2)
 (2)

References

1500
1500 metres at the European Athletics Championships